Angom Anita Chanu is an Indian judoka, played in the lightweight (-52 kg) in various National and International tournaments.

She won her bronze medal at Asian Judo Championship at Bangkok in 2013 by defeating Kazakhstan’s Olessya Kutsenko.

Awards

References

External links 
 Angom Anita CHANU / IJF.org
 

Living people
Indian female judoka
Indian female martial artists
Judoka at the 2002 Commonwealth Games
Judoka at the 2006 Asian Games
Judoka at the 2010 Asian Games
1984 births
Sportswomen from Manipur
Martial artists from Manipur
Recipients of the Arjuna Award
Commonwealth Games competitors for India
Asian Games competitors for India